Neosminthurus is a genus of globular springtails in the family Sminthuridae, found in Central and North America. There are at least 3 described species in Neosminthurus.

Species
 Neosminthurus bakeri Snider, 1978
 Neosminthurus clavatus (Banks, 1897)
 Neosminthurus richardsi Snider, 1978

References

External links

 

Springtail genera